Sadagat Valiyeva (born 5 May 1989) is an Azerbaijani beach soccer referee and a former footballer who played as a forward. She has been a member of the Azerbaijan women's national team.

Referee career
Valiyeva was a referee in two matches at the 2018 Women's Euro Winners Cup.

References

1989 births
Living people
Women's association football forwards
Women association football referees
Women's association football referees
Azerbaijani women's footballers
Azerbaijan women's international footballers
Azerbaijani football referees